Rogue Planet is a 2000 novel set in the Star Wars galaxy. It is a prequel novel occurring after the events of Star Wars: Episode I – The Phantom Menace. The book was written by Greg Bear. The cover art was by David Stevenson. The book takes place 29 years before Star Wars Episode IV: A New Hope.

Synopsis
The story takes place a few years after the events of Star Wars: Episode I – The Phantom Menace. Young Anakin Skywalker chafes under his new life as a Jedi apprentice. He sneaks away from Obi-Wan Kenobi to participate in and gamble on deadly flying games. This is interrupted by a Blood Carver assassin.

The Jedi Council decides Anakin would be best served to send him with Obi-Wan to investigate the remote world of Zonama Sekot, a world that produces organic spacecraft. A Jedi has gone missing on Sekot.

A battle squadron pursues the two Jedi; it is headed by a weapons designer that has already blueprinted the Death Star. Commander Tarkin, the future Grand Moff Tarkin becomes involved as well.

Blood Carver assassins appear again, the Jedi grow their own ship and no less than two fleets threaten the planet.

Links to other Expanded Universe material
The introduction of Zonama Sekot and the mysterious Jedi Vergere provided some of the first major links between the pre-Episode IV and post-Episode IV Star Wars expanded universe materials; both figure prominently in The New Jedi Order series. This may be because Zonama Sekot the rogue planet was really a seed of the original Yuuzhan'Tar, the destroyed homeworld of the Yuuzhan Vong. Actually the Yuuzhan Vong were in the galaxy since the days of the Galactic Republic, but did not interfere until the New Jedi Order Era.

References

External links
 Amazon.com Listing
 Official CargoBay Listing

2000 novels
2000 science fiction novels
Star Wars Legends novels
Del Rey books